Cetatea may refer to several villages in Romania:

 Cetatea, a village in Dobromir Commune, Constanța County
 Cetatea, a village in Frătești Commune, Giurgiu County
 Cetatea, a village in Căpreni Commune, Gorj County
 Cetatea, a village in Rădoiești Commune, Teleorman County

and to:

 Cetatea Albă, the Romanian name for Bilhorod-Dnistrovskyi, Odessa Oblast, Ukraine

See also 
 Cetate (disambiguation)
 Cetățuia (disambiguation)